Newtown, is a district in the Port of Spain, Trinidad and Tobago. Over the years Newtown has evolved into a well developed business area with large residences being converted into business places or being torn down with the intention to build a more business like location.

Churches

One of the older buildings which has retained most of its historical look is the St. Patrick's R.C. Church. In 2014, renovations to the roof and other areas were completed with funds raised by the parishioners over a number of years. This church boasts of several stained glass windows and is styled in a similar manner to the St. Crispin's Anglican Church which is located a few streets away in close proximity to the Siegert Square. Both churches have antique baptismal fonts at the back of the church.

Schools

Newtown is one of the areas which had at least one primary school for boys and one for girls, which is the Newtown Boys and Newtown Girls. Known for success in academics and Music Festival competitions, these schools are located on either side of the St. Patrick's R.C. Church with access from Maraval Road.

There are also private secondary schools and Government run schools located in close proximity to Maraval Road and Tragarete Road, such as Wood Brook Secondary School  and St. Cecelia's Private Secondary School.

Over the years a branch of a tertiary educational institute, SBCS, has offered its services from two locations on Picton Street.

References 

Geography of Port of Spain